William Copeland may refer to:

 William Copeland (brewer) (1834–1902), Norwegian-American brewer
 William Copeland (umpire) (1929–2011), Australian test cricket umpire
 William Fowler Mountford Copeland (1872–1953), British horticulturist
William L. Copeland (1846–1885), state legislator and police officer in Arkansas
 William H. Copeland (1848–1931), Ohio state legislator
 William Taylor Copeland (1797–1868), British businessman and politician